Ali Sina is the pseudonym of an Iranian-born Canadian ex-Muslim activist and critic of Islam. Sina is the founder of the anti-Muslim website WikiIslam and maintains a number of websites promoting what he refers to as "the truth" about Islam. He is associated with the counter-jihad movement.

Work
In 2001, Sina founded Faith Freedom International (FFI), a popular anti-Muslim counter-jihad website that describes its aims as "unmask[ing] Islam and help[ing] Muslims leave [the faith]." He later founded WikiIslam in 2006 and also began the alisina.org blog "dedicated to attacking Islam." 

He hoped to begin filming a biopic of Muhammad in 2013, claiming to have raised $2 million out of a total $10 million goal for the film as of 2012.

Sina is a board member of Pamela Geller's Stop Islamization of Nations.

Views
Sina has questioned Islam's validity as a religion and called it "an unreformable, violent, militant political cult". He and his associates have used his platform to argue that Islam is an intrinsically evil and false religion and an "overgrown cult." He has also made claims to offer $50,000 to anyone who can refute his accusation that Muhammad was "a narcissist, a misogynist, a rapist, a paedophile, a lecher, a torturer, a mass murderer, a cult leader, an assassin, a terrorist, a madman and a looter". Sina deemed the word "Muslim" to be synonymous with "stupid, barbarian, thug, arrogant, brain dead, zombie, hooligan, goon, shameless, savage and many other ignoble things".

Reception
Sina, FFI, and WikiIslam have been noted for their anti-Muslim rhetoric. Sina has been cited as an example of "anti-Islamic fanaticism" and is considered a virulently anti-Islamic activist. He has been quoted by Geert Wilders, a Dutch far-right politician.

Notes

See also

Anwar Sheikh
Ibn Warraq
Robert B. Spencer

References

External links 

 

Living people
Former Muslim critics of Islam
Iranian emigrants to Canada
Canadian critics of Islam
Year of birth missing (living people)
Counter-jihad activists